A recording head is the physical interface between a recording apparatus and a moving recording medium. Recording heads are generally classified according to the physical principle that allows them to impress their data upon their medium. A recording head is often mechanically paired with a playback head, which, though proximal to, is often discrete from the record head.

Types
The two most common forms of recording head are:
 Magnetic - Magnetic recording heads use the principles of electromagnetism to coerce a paramagnetic recording medium, such as iron oxides, to orient in a readable manner such as magnetic tape. Record heads are constructed of laminated permalloy, ferrite, or sendust. As of 2006, this is the most dominant type of head in use.
 Optical - Optical recording heads use the principles of optics and light to impart energy on a recording medium, which accepts the energy in a readable manner, e.g. by melting or photography.

Note that Magneto-optical recording, though using optics and heat, should properly be considered a magnetic process, since the data stored on magneto-optical media is stored magnetically.

Earlier systems, such as phonograph records, used mechanical heads known as styli to physically cut grooves in the recording medium, in a configuration (of size, width, depth and position) recoverable as sound.

Photo gallery

See also
Analog recording
Cassette demagnetizer
Compact Cassette
Digital recording
Sound recording and reproduction
VCR
Videotape
Video head cleaner
VTR

External links 
 Diagrams and explanations of recording heads and the tape recording process.
 An Ampex recording head, deconstructed.
 A tape recorder, showing the head assemblies.
 Photo of an early recording head as part of a wire recorder.

Recording